Hyman L. "Hymie" Ginsburg (March 23, 1914 – March 2, 1986) was an American professional basketball player.

Career 
After playing at Geneva College, Ginsburg played in the National Basketball League for the Pittsburgh Pirates between 1937 and 1939. In his 15-game NBL career, Ginsburg averaged 5.6 points per game. Ginsburg later established the men's basketball program at Walsh University and served as their first head coach from 1962 to 1966.

References

External links
 Beaver County Hall of Fame profile

1914 births
1986 deaths
American men's basketball players
United States Army personnel of World War II
Basketball players from Pennsylvania
Basketball players from Canton, Ohio
Geneva Golden Tornadoes men's basketball players
Guards (basketball)
Jewish men's basketball players
People from Beaver Falls, Pennsylvania
Pittsburgh Pirates (NBL) players
Walsh Cavaliers men's basketball coaches